The Derbi GPR 125 is a street motorcycle sold by Derbi - Nacional Motor since 2005. The original GPR125 was powered by a single-cylinder two-stroke engine with a steel lined cast iron cylinder manufactured by Yamaha, but was superseded in 2010 by an all-new DOHC four-stroke four-valve model.

Two-stroke GPR125
The engine in the original two-stroke model is sourced from Yamaha. This engine was used in the Yamaha DTR125 Dual Sport and TZR125 sport bike. Engine parts from these two bikes will directly swap with the Derbi. It uses the Yamaha Yamaha Power Valve System, a two-stroke power valve system, which consists of a rotary valve located in the exhaust port which changes the exhaust port timing and area. The power valve is controlled by an ECU and servo motor.

Four-stroke GPR125
In 2010 the engine was changed to a new four-stroke engine. The single cylinder engine features double overhead camshafts and four valves.

References

External links
 Official website GPR 125 4T 4V

Sport bikes
GPR125
Motorcycles introduced in 2005
Two-stroke motorcycles